Blue Lagoon may refer to:

Places
Blue Lagoon (geothermal spa), Iceland
Blue Lagoon Island, near Nassau, Bahamas
Blue Lagoon Local Nature Reserve, Bletchley, Milton Keynes, England
Blue Lagoon National Park, Zambia
Blue Lagoon Reservoir or Ward's Reservoir, a reservoir near Belmont, Lancashire, England
Ölüdeniz or Blue Lagoon, Turkey
Harpur Hill Quarry, Derbyshire, England, known locally as the Blue Lagoon
Blue Lagoon, a flooded slate quarry near Abereiddy, Wales
Blue Lagoon Bay, near Comino, Malta
Blue Lagoon, a cove in Portland, Jamaica

Fiction
The Blue Lagoon (novel), a 1908 novel by Henry De Vere Stacpoole
The Blue Lagoon (1923 film), a silent film, based on the novel, starring Molly Adair and Dick Cruickshanks
The Blue Lagoon (1949 film), a British film, based on the novel, starring Jean Simmons and Donald Houston
The Blue Lagoon (1980 film), an American-Australian film, based on the novel, starring Brooke Shields and Christopher Atkins
Return to the Blue Lagoon, a 1991 sequel of the 1980 film
Blue Lagoon: The Awakening, a 2012 Lifetime television movie

Other uses
The Blue Lagoon (restaurant), a restaurant at Disneyland Paris renamed Captain Jack's in 2017
Blue Lagoon (cocktail)
Princess Selandia or Blue Lagoon, a former floating nightclub in Barrow-in-Furness, United Kingdom
Blue Lagoon Water Park, Pembrokeshire, an indoor water park in Pembrokeshire, Wales
Blue Lagoon, Queensland, a former outdoor water park area at Dreamworld in Gold Coast, Queensland, Australia

See also
Laguna Azul (disambiguation)